Semedo — a variant of chess, presumably invented by Álvaro Semedo.

Description 
Some chess historians dispute the existence of such chess in general. Supposedly invented by a Jesuit missionary in China, Álvaro Semedo. Subsequently, other Catholic missionaries in China reported a special Chinese chess called "semedo". A description of this game in latin is given in a book published in 1694 in England.

Board 
Initial semedo alignment (♔ ♚ — kings, ♕ ♛ — scientists, ♘ ♞ — knights, ♙ ♟ — pawns, ◬ ⟁ — rockets):

References

External links 
 Rules Semedo (chess)
 The Meeting of Shen Fuzong and Thomas Hyde in 1687. A Lecture for the Oxford Bibliographical Society, 1 March 2010.

Chess variants
History of chess